Daniel de Weldon is an American actor, screenwriter, director and producer. de Weldon is a native of Washington, D.C. and Newport, Rhode Island. He is the son of sculptor Felix de Weldon, known for the Marine Corps War Memorial statue of the flag raising at Iwo Jima, official United States Presidential busts of John F. Kennedy and President Harry S. Truman.

After completing a six-year masters program in Theatrical Arts under Uta Hagen and Howard Fine, de Weldon presented himself to the Actors Studio and garnered the title of Lifetime Member under Al Pacino, Lou Antonio, Barbara Bain, Martin Landau, Mark Rydell, Ellen Burstyn, and Harvey Keitel.

His work "The Making of a Dream Come True vs. Doubt" was first published with The Minds Journal in December 2017.

Theatre
de Weldon's theatrical debut was in the 1999 Los Angeles production of David Rabe's Streamers, receiving the Los Angeles Times Critics' Choice. de Weldon went on to produce, direct and star in the 2003 LA production of Edward Albees’ The Zoo Story garnering the Los Angeles Times "Best LA Theater" by audience recognition.

In 2006, he starred opposite Charles Dierkop in The Actors Studio presentation of Death of a Salesman. In 2007 de Weldon then produced and starred in the Los Angeles play, Danny and The Deep Blue Sea with Deborah Dir. This revival of the classic John Patrick Shanley play ran for eight months and received 15 acclaimed Critics' Choice. At the 29th Annual LA Weekly Theater Awards Danny and The Deep Blue Sea was nominated for Best Two-Person Show and Best Production Design.

In 2009, de Weldon starred opposite three-time Emmy Award-winning actress Barbara Bain in The Laramie Project:Ten Years Later at Grand Performances in Los Angeles, hosted by Glenn Close presented worldwide in 150 cities by satellite.

de Weldon starred as the lead man opposite Frances Fisher in the 2013 production of A Muse of Fire.

Television
Presently, de Weldon is starring in the leading role of Gar Madden in the upcoming TV series titled
Chaser (Season one - 8 episodes) with executive producer Jeremy Howe (CBS's "Big Bang Theory" and "Young Sheldon") 
distributed by Buffalo8.com for major network release summer of 2023.

​de Weldon starred in the lead male role of Young Doc Holliday in the TV pilot series "Badland Wives" directed by Stephen Campanelli 
("Sully", "Three Billboards Outside Ebbing", Missouri", "Indian Horse", and "Momentum

Film
On the screen, de Weldon's feature film credits include: Select Fit (2004) and The Bill (dir. Daniel Roemer); Project Greenlight Official Selection, On The Lot finalist (actor) producer- Steven Spielberg, LA Shorts Fest Official Selection, top-five finalists for best film ($1 million prize).

de Weldon starred in The Night Before The Morning After (2006) dir. Max Maksimovic) -Kansas City Film Fest Official Selection; Fortune's 500 (2019); and Amsterdam (2019) (dir. Ron Fernandez).

He has taken on the role of film producer through his company Volition Entertainment Productions. The first film, The Elephant Ride stars de Weldon and is based on a true story. Currently attached to the project are producer David Hillary (Deviant films), Grammy award winner SEAL, Emmy award winner Armand Assante, and Wolfgang Hatz, aka Audi's "Mr. Engine".

Also in development is the biopic based on the life of Daniel's father Felix de Weldon, titled Monumental. The film encapsulates his life and career as an artist. Daniel de Weldon is collaborating on the script with Allen Nalasco and is slated to play the role of his father during the height of his career. Produced with Barry Krost Literary Management and George Schlatter Productions.

Currently, de Weldon is starring in the upcoming feature films in 2023: V4 Vengeance, Buddha & Clyde, The Elephant Ride starring opposite Armand Assante, Seal, Robert Miano, Ilia Volok, Natalie Burn, Monster In Love (Shakespeare's Othello adaptation), and Weekend Warriors playing opposite Emmy and Golden Globe-nominated actor Corbin Bernsen and Jason London. Premiering in 2023, de Weldon stars opposite Robert Davi and Dee Wallace in The Legends of Catclaws Mountain distributed by Lionsgate Films - Grinder House.

In 2019, de Weldon starred in the feature films One Must Fall, and Underdog.  One Must Fall is directed by Antonio Pantoja and is was an Official Selection for the Horrorhound Film Festival and premiered in March 2019 in Cincinnati, Ohio.

References

External links
 
 
 Stage Scene LA Review
 Splash Magazine
 Plays 411 Reviews
 Backstage West
 Stage Happenings Review

American people of Austrian descent
Year of birth missing (living people)
Living people
Male actors from Washington, D.C.
Male actors from Baltimore
20th-century American male actors
21st-century American male actors